Wilcox is a populated place in Albany County, Wyoming, United States. On June 2, 1899, Butch Cassidy robbed a train near Wilcox and made off with US$36,000.

References

Populated places in Albany County, Wyoming
Unincorporated communities in Albany County, Wyoming
Unincorporated communities in Wyoming